Booie is a rural locality in the South Burnett Region, Queensland, Australia. In the  Booie had a population of 1,040 people.

Geography
Hillsdale is a neighbourhood in the south of the locality.

Redvale is a neighbourhood in the south-west of the locality.

History
The name Booie derives from the name of a pastoral run, which is believed to be a Wakawaka language word meaning  carpet snake.

Land in Booie was open for selection on 17 April 1877;  were available.

Booie Provisional School opened in September 1892. In 1905, a new Booie State School was erected. Booie State School closed circa 1963. It was at 1015 Booie Crawford Road.

Three Mile State School opened on 1 June 1911, but was soon renamed Redvale State School. It closed circa 1939. It was on the north-east corner of Kingaroy Barkers Creek Road and Redvale Road.

Hillsdale State School opened on 23 November 1916. It had a number of temporary closures over the years. It closed permanently on 31 December 1966. It was at 6 Mcauliffes Road.

In the 2011 census, the population was 912 people.

In the  Booie had a population of 1,040 people.

Booie Monster
In June 1954, Booie hit the news after local boys claimed to have seen a two-legged monster in a cave. Despite searching by experienced bushman, the monster was not found and it was speculated that the boys had seen a large kangaroo.

References

External links
 

South Burnett Region
Localities in Queensland